Koziatyn (also referred to as Kozyatyn; , ;) is a town in the Vinnytsia Oblast (province) in central Ukraine. It lies on the banks of the Huyva River. Population:

History

The village of Koziatyn was first mentioned in 1734. The city was founded at the time of construction of Kyiv-Baltic railway. Koziatyn became a town of the Berdychiv district of Kyiv Governorate on July 7, 1874. In April 1920, during the Polish-Bolshevik War, the town was captured by Polish forces in what became known as the Raid on Koziatyn. In 1923 Koziatyn became the district center of Berdychev okrug. A few years later, the district was included in the Vinnitsa Oblast. During World War II, Koziatyn was under German occupation from 15 July 1941 until 28 December 1943. It was administered as a part of Reichskommissariat Ukraine from 1 September 1941 until 28 December 1943.

Economic details

A total of 13 railways, 5 industrial, and more than 150 private enterprises build up Koziatyn's vivid economy. The reason behind the abundant economic growth is town's unique location on an intersection of major railways. The railroad business accounts for 90% of town's budget income. The food industry is another important source of income. The city council started the City Economic Development project in October 2003 in cooperation with the "Ukraine-USA" foundation.

Twin towns – sister cities
Koziatyn is twinned with:

  Krasnogorsk, Russia
  Leżajsk, Poland
   Bolzano, Italy

Gallery

References

External links

sister-cities.org
The murder of the Jews of Koziatyn during World War II, at Yad Vashem website.

Cities in Vinnytsia Oblast
Berdichevsky Uyezd
Cities of regional significance in Ukraine
Holocaust locations in Ukraine
Railway towns in Ukraine